The striped barb (Desmopuntius johorensis), is a species of cyprinid fish Cyprinidae native to the Malay Peninsula, Borneo, and Sumatra where it is found in the shallows of rivers, streams and ditches.  This species can reach a length of  TL.  It is commercially important to local fisheries and can also be found in the aquarium trade.

References

Desmopuntius
Fish of Thailand
Fish described in 1904